Cathepsin O is an enzyme that in humans is encoded by the CTSO gene.

Function 
Cathepsin O is a cysteine cathepsin, a cysteine protease and a member of the cathepsin family. This proteolytic enzyme is involved in cellular protein degradation and turnover. The recombinant form of this enzyme was shown to degrade synthetic peptides typically used as substrates for cysteine proteinases, and its proteolytic activity was abolished by an inhibitor of cysteine proteinase.

References

Further reading

External links
 The MEROPS online database for peptidases and their inhibitors: C01.035

Proteases
EC 3.4.22